The 1976 South Carolina State Bulldogs football team represented South Carolina State University as a member of the Mid-Eastern Athletic Conference (MEAC) during the 1976 NCAA Division II football season. In its fourth season under head coach Willie Jeffries, the team compiled a 10–1 record (5–1 against conference opponents), tied for the MEAC championship, defeated  in the Bicentennial Bowl, and outscored opponents by a total of 278 to 44. The team was recognized as the 1976 black college football national champion and was ranked No. 8 by the Associated Press in the final 1976 NCAA Division II football rankings.

Schedule

References

South Carolina State
South Carolina State Bulldogs football seasons
Black college football national champions
Mid-Eastern Athletic Conference football champion seasons
South Carolina State Bulldogs football